Earning can refer to:

Labour (economics)
Earnings of a company
Merit